Theoretically is an album by alto saxophonist Tim Berne and electric guitarist Bill Frisell originally released on the Empire label in 1984, and again on Minor Music in 1986 with a bonus track recorded at the original sessions. The original features three compositions by Berne, two by Frisell, and one joint composition; the bonus track on the 1986 edition is a composition by Berne.

Reception
The Allmusic review by Daniel Gioffre awarded the album 3 stars stating "The overall feel of this record puts it almost into ambient territory, as Frisell's volume swells and Berne's upper register squeals blend into a single fabric of weighty yet spacious sound. It is a place where melody emerges almost as a surprise from a strangely menacing backdrop of pure atmosphere... It all works, no doubt about it, but there is room to question the quality of the source material. Overall, this is a good, if not particularly great, album from two musicians at the top of their game.".

Track listing

Original Release
 "M" (Frisell, Berne) – 6:04
 "Inside the Brain" (Berne) – 8:30
 "Preview" (Berne) – 4:06
 "Caroline" (Frisell) – 3:32
 "2011" (Berne) – 16:17
 "Perky Figure" (Frisell) – 2:42

1986 Reissue
 "M" (Frisell, Berne) – 6:04
 "Inside the Brain" (Berne) – 8:30
 "Preview" (Berne) – 4:06
 "Caroline" (Frisell) – 3:32
 "Ground Floor" (Berne) – 7:37
 "2011" (Berne) – 16:17
 "Perky Figure" (Frisell) – 2:42

Personnel
Bill Frisell – guitar
Tim Berne – alto saxophone

References 

1984 albums
Bill Frisell albums
Tim Berne albums